Perrottetia multiflora is a species of plant in the plant order Huerteales. It is found in Costa Rica, Panama, and Venezuela. It is threatened by habitat loss.

References

multiflora
Near threatened plants
Flora of Central America
Flora of South America
Taxonomy articles created by Polbot